Ronan Hayes (born 1998) is an Irish hurler who plays for Dublin Senior Championship club Kilmacud Crokes and at inter-county level with the Dublin senior hurling team. He usually lines out as a full-forward.

Career

A member of the Kilmacud Crokes club, Hayes first came to prominence on the inter-county scene with the Dublin minor team that won the 2016 Leinster Minor Championship. He subsequently spent one season with the Dublin under-21 team, while simultaneously lining out with University College Dublin in the Fitzgibbon Cup. Hayes made his senior debut during the 2018 National League.

Career statistics

Honours

Dublin
Leinster Minor Hurling Championship: 2016

References

External links
Ronan Hayes profile at the Dublin GAA website

1998 births
Living people
Kilmacud Crokes hurlers
UCD hurlers
Dublin inter-county hurlers